Street Racing Syndicate is an open world multiplatform racing video game produced by Eutechnyx, and released by Namco on August 31, 2004 for the PlayStation 2, GameCube, Xbox and Windows-based personal computers. The game was also released for the Game Boy Advance on October 4, 2005. During its release, it was meant to compete against Need for Speed: Underground 2, the sequel to the critically acclaimed first game released in 2003.

Gameplay
The game features an underground import racing scene, on which the player's main objective is to live the life of a street racer, gaining respect and affection of various women in the city. This is featured in a way that the player must win a variety of respect challenges to attract girls and maintain a good victory streak in order to ensure that they remain with the player. Once in their car, the girls will present the next open race that the player enters. As the player continues to win races, dance videos will be unlocked for viewing. Also, another plot in the game's story mode is to earn a customized Nissan Skyline GT-R R34 after winning races.

The game has 50 licensed cars from a variety of manufacturers, including models from Nissan, Toyota, Mitsubishi, Lexus, Subaru, Mazda, and Volkswagen. SRS also features a car damage model that forces the player to drive carefully, heavy damages may impact car performance and heavy repairs may drain the player of money earned from their last race. The Game Boy Advance version does not have licensed car names, lacks police chases and career free roam, and customization is different from other platforms.

Development

Street Racing Syndicate initially received publishing support from The 3DO Company. While the game was still in development, 3DO declared bankruptcy and auctioned off Street Racing Syndicate along with its other assets. Namco picked up SRS for $1.5 million, compared to the $1.3 million that Ubisoft paid for the Heroes of Might and Magic franchise.

Reception

The GameCube, PlayStation 2 and Xbox versions received "mixed or average reviews" according to video game review aggregator Metacritic.

References

External links

2004 video games
Eutechnyx games
Game Boy Advance games
GameCube games
PlayStation 2 games
Racing video games
Windows games
Xbox games
Street racing video games
Video games developed in the United Kingdom
Video games scored by Tom Salta
Video games set in Los Angeles
Video games set in Miami
Video games set in Pennsylvania